The Colombian Orienteering Federation is the national Orienteering Association in Colombia. It is recognized as the  orienteering association for Colombia by the International Orienteering Federation, of which it is a member.

References

Colombia